Rupert Sloman (23 June 1890 – 2 August 1951) was a New Zealand cricketer. He played four first-class matches for Auckland between 1913 and 1919.

See also
 List of Auckland representative cricketers

References

External links
 

1890 births
1951 deaths
New Zealand cricketers
Auckland cricketers
Cricketers from Auckland